Nunukan Tidong or Southern Tidung, is one of several Sabahan languages of Kalimantan, Indonesia, spoken by the Tidong people. It has lost the system of Austronesian alignment retained by Northern Tidung in Sabah, Malaysia.

References

Murutic languages
Languages of Sabah
Languages of Indonesia